Documentation is a set of documents provided on paper, or online, or on digital or analog media, such as audio tape or CDs.

Documentation may also refer to:
 Document, written or drawn representation of thoughts
 Documentation science, study of the recording and retrieval of information
 Bibliography, academic study of books as physical, cultural objects
 Software documentation, written text that accompanies computer software